Anthony James Pulis (born 21 July 1984) is a Welsh football coach and former player who is currently the head coach of Miami FC in the USL Championship.

A journeyman for much of his career Pulis represented Portsmouth, Stoke City, Torquay United, Plymouth Argyle, Grimsby Town, Bristol Rovers, Southampton, Lincoln City, Stockport County, Barnet and Aldershot Town during 10 years spent playing in England before moving abroad and establishing himself in the USL Pro with Orlando City. He made four appearances for the Wales under-21 team, but did not represent his country at senior level.

Club career

Portsmouth
Bristol-born Pulis began his career as a trainee with Portsmouth whilst his father Tony managed the club, turning professional in July 2003. Despite his father's sacking after only 10 months in charge, Anthony stayed at Fratton Park, hoping to break into the club's first team. He made just one first team appearance for Pompey, as a substitute in the 2–0 League Cup win away to Cardiff City on 9 November 2004.

Stoke City
In December 2004, after failing to make an impact on the Portsmouth first team, Anthony Pulis and teammate Lewis Buxton each signed two and a half-year contracts with the elder Pulis' side, Stoke City.

Almost immediately after his arrival at Stoke, Anthony joined Torquay United on loan, making his league debut as a first-half substitute for Alex Russell as Torquay lost 2–1 at home to Stockport County on 1 January 2005. However his appearances were limited and his loan spell was cut short.

Pulis once again found his first team opportunities scarce after his father was dismissed and replaced by Johan Boskamp prior to the 2005–06 season. In February 2006, he joined Doncaster Rovers on trial, however no permanent deal materialised and he returned to Stoke. Towards the end of the 2005–06 season he was loaned to Plymouth Argyle, linking up with his father for the third time in his career.

After his loan spell, Pulis returned to the Britannia Stadium for the 2006–07 season, coinciding with his father's June 2006 managerial reappointment there. He moved, along with Martin Paterson, to Grimsby Town on loan on 23 November 2006. However, he made only nine appearances before his loan spell was cut short due to injury. In his second-last appearance, he was substituted at half-time as Grimsby suffered a 4–0 loss to Rochdale.

The 2007–08 season started brightly for Pulis. He gained his first assist for the club, as his corner set up a Jon Parkin header in a 3–2 defeat to Southampton, however injury problems kept him sidelined for several months thereafter. He was loaned out again, on this occasion to Bristol Rovers, however he made only one appearance for the club before his loan spell was curtailed due to another injury. In his only appearance for the club, a 14-minute cameo in a 2–0 defeat to Doncaster Rovers, Pulis conceded a penalty kick and was booked.

Southampton
In August 2008 Pulis moved to Southampton on a two-year contract a free transfer.

He joined League Two team Lincoln City on one-month loan in October 2009 making his debut on 10 October in a 1–0 away win against Macclesfield Town. Pulis became an instant first team regular at Lincoln but left the club when his loan contract expired on 7 January 2010. He had spent the previous six weeks on the injured list.

In October 2010, he joined Stockport County on loan for a month and made his debut for the club on 9 October 2010 in a match against Gillingham, a club his father managed, in which he scored a consolation goal for Stockport. This was his first competitive goal of his eight-year career. The loan was extended into a second and third month.

Pulis joined Barnet on loan in February 2011 but was sent off 29 minutes into his debut, a 3–0 defeat at home to Torquay United.

Anthony Pulis was released by Southampton on 21 May 2011, having never made a first-team appearance for the club.

Aldershot Town
At the start of August 2011, it was announced that Pulis had signed for League Two side Aldershot Town, on a one-year contract. He went on to make five league and two League Cup appearances for the club, of which he only started one game.

Orlando City
In January 2012 Pulis joined USL Pro side Orlando City, Stoke's American affiliate in the third tier of the American soccer pyramid. He scored his first goal for the Lions against the Richmond Kickers in a 2–0 win. In his three seasons at Orlando, the club won one USL Pro Championship and two Commissioner's Cups.

Pulis was a player-coach during his three years playing for Orlando and at the end of the 2014 season he announced his retirement from playing to move into coaching full-time.

Coaching career

Orlando City B 
On 15 October 2015, Pulis was announced as the head-coach of USL League One club Orlando City B.

Saint Louis FC 
On 20 November 2017, Pulis stepped down as the head coach of Orlando City B and signed as a head-coach with Saint Louis FC.

Inter Miami CF 
On 1 March 2021, Inter Miami CF announced Pulis as an assistant coach.

Miami FC 
On 29 November 2021, Pulis was announced as the new head coach of Miami FC.

Personal life
Pulis is a Catholic and regularly attends church. He is the son of Welsh football manager Tony Pulis and the nephew of former footballer Ray Pulis.

Career statistics
Sourced from Soccerbase.com

A.  The "Other" column constitutes appearances and goals in the Football League Trophy.

References

External links
 Anthony Pulis Interview

1984 births
Living people
Footballers from Bristol
Welsh Roman Catholics
Welsh footballers
Association football midfielders
Portsmouth F.C. players
Stoke City F.C. players
Torquay United F.C. players
Plymouth Argyle F.C. players
Grimsby Town F.C. players
Bristol Rovers F.C. players
Southampton F.C. players
Lincoln City F.C. players
Stockport County F.C. players
Barnet F.C. players
Aldershot Town F.C. players
Orlando City SC (2010–2014) players
English Football League players
USL Championship players
Wales under-21 international footballers
Welsh expatriate footballers
Welsh expatriate sportspeople in the United States
Expatriate soccer players in the United States
Orlando City SC non-playing staff
Welsh football managers
Orlando City B coaches
Saint Louis FC coaches
Miami FC coaches
USL Championship coaches
Welsh expatriate football managers
Expatriate soccer managers in the United States
Inter Miami CF non-playing staff
Association football coaches